Dotum is a Korean TrueType sans-serif font with a Latin shape similar to that of Helvetica.  Version 5.00 of the font is provided as part of Windows Vista, Windows 7, Windows 8, and Windows Server 2008.

References

Sans-serif typefaces
Microsoft typefaces
Windows Vista typefaces
Typefaces and fonts introduced in 2000